Mad About Dance is an 2014 Indian dance film. The film is directed by Saahil Prem. The film stars Saahil Prem and Amrit Maghera in the lead roles. Saahil Prem debuted as an actor alongside Sunny Leone in the 2014 film Ragini MMS 2.

Essentially a dance film, it focuses on the youth, their dreams, anxieties, disappointments and hopes for their future. The film is based in the university town of Sheffield and brings to light the stories of Asian students who leave their home and country and go to study abroad, their struggles, heartbreaks, trials and triumphs.

Cast
Saahil Prem   ...  Aarav 
Amrit Maghera  ...  Aashira 
Salah Benlemqawanssa  ...  AJ 
Akilesh Unnitan  ...  Atul 
Abhishek Saha  ...  Dipen 
Raashul Tandon  ...  GG 
Jon Jo  Jon Jo   ...  Henry  
Kiyani Aziz   ...  Salim 
Sandeep Garcha   ...  Mrs. Qureshi 
Helen Grayson  ...  Dance Support 
Emiko Ishii ...  Amy 
Emma Jones  ...  Announcer 
Mark Monero  ...  Ceaser 
Ameet Panesar  ...  Wagz 
Sumeet Panesar ...  Jagz

Soundtrack

References

External links
 
 https://www.facebook.com/madabtdance

2014 films
2010s Hindi-language films
Indian dance films